1st millennium BC in music – 1st millennium in music – 11th century in music

Events 
 ca. 150 – Claudius Ptolemaeus writes his treatise Harmonics
 ca. 510 – Boethius writes De institutione musica as one part of his "quadrivium".
 ca. 635 – Isidore of Seville compiles the Etymologiae
 ca. 795–800 – Tonary of St Riquier, the earliest Western source organized according to the eight Gregorian modes, borrowed from the Byzantine octoechos system
 9th century – Notker the Stammerer explains the supplementary letters for neumatic notation in his Epistola ad Lantbertum.
 ca. 850 – Aurelian of Réôme writes the earliest extant medieval treatise on music, Musica disciplina.
 ca. 890 – compilation of the Musica enchiriadis, the earliest known treatise on polyphony.
 ca. 900 – compilation of the Scolica enchiriadis, a commentary on the Musica enchiriadis.
 ca. 908–915 – Regino of Prüm writes De harmonica institutione, the first full tonary for the texts of the liturgy, at St. Martin of Trier

Classical music 
 late 3rd century – Oxyrhynchus hymn, the earliest known Christian hymn to contain both lyrics and musical notation
 ca. 9th–10th century – Gregorian chants first used see list of Gregorian chants
 884 – Liber Hymnorum completed by Notker the Stammerer at the Abbey of Saint Gall in Switzerland.

Births 
 ca. 83 – Claudius Ptolemaeus
 ca. 480 – Anicius Manlius Severinus Boethius
 ca. 767/772 – Ishaq al-Mawsili
 ca. 840 – Notker the Stammerer
 ca. 850 – Hucbald
 ca. 850 – Tuotilo

Deaths 
 161 – Claudius Ptolemaeus
 ca. 524 – Anicius Manlius Severinus Boethius
 4 April 636 – Isidore of Seville
 864 – Hartmann of Saint Gall
 ca. 890 – Ratpert of Saint Gall
 915 – Regino of Prüm
 27 April 915 – Tuotilo
 6 April 919 – Notker the Stammerer
 20 June 930 – Hucbald of St. Amand

See also
List of years in music

References

Sources

Music